United Nations General Assembly Resolution 303, adopted on 9 December 1949 by a vote of 38 to 14 (with 7 abstentions), restated the United Nations' support for a Corpus separatum in Jerusalem. Notably the voting pattern was significantly different from that of the United Nations Partition Plan for Palestine vote two years earlier, with many states swapping sides. In particular, all the Arab and Muslim countries voted for the corpus separatum, having voted against the 1947 plan; conversely the United States and Israel voted against the corpus separatum, having previously supported it.

The outcome of the vote was "even more decisive than the vote for the Partition Plan itself".

Background 

In July 1920, at the San Remo conference, a Class "A" League of Nations mandates over Palestine was allocated to the British. On 29 November 1947, the UN General Assembly adopted a resolution recommending "to the United Kingdom, as the mandatory Power for Palestine, and to all other Members of the United Nations the adoption and implementation, with regard to the future government of Palestine, of the Plan of Partition with Economic Union" as Resolution 181 (II). The plan contained a proposal to terminate the British Mandate for Palestine and partition Palestine into "independent Arab and Jewish States and the Special International Regime for the City of Jerusalem." On 14 May 1948, the day on which the British Mandate over Palestine expired, the Jewish People's Council gathered at the Tel Aviv Museum, and approved a proclamation which declared the establishment of a Jewish state in Eretz Israel, to be known as the State of Israel.

On 11 May 1949, Israel was admitted to membership in the United Nations.

Early in December 1949, Israel declared Jerusalem as its capital, despite controlling only West Jerusalem, with East Jerusalem (including the Old City) being controlled by Transjordan.

The resolution 

The full text of the Resolution:

Response

Israel

Voting record for Resolution 303(IV)

Comparison versus 1947 Partition Plan

Further reading
 Ball, M. Margaret. “Bloc Voting in the General Assembly.” International Organization, vol. 5, no. 1, 1951, pp. 3–31. JSTOR, www.jstor.org/stable/2703786. Accessed 16 Feb. 2020.
 Ferrari, Silvio. “The Holy See and the Postwar Palestine Issue: The Internationalization of Jerusalem and the Protection of the Holy Places.” International Affairs, vol. 60, no. 2, 1984, pp. 261–283. JSTOR, www.jstor.org/stable/2619049. Accessed 16 Feb. 2020.
 “Documents and Source Material: Documents Concerning the Status of Jerusalem.” Journal of Palestine Studies, vol. 1, no. 1, 1971, pp. 171–194. JSTOR, www.jstor.org/stable/2536012. Accessed 16 Feb. 2020.
 Glick, Edward B. “The Vatican, Latin America, and Jerusalem.” International Organization, vol. 11, no. 2, 1957, pp. 213–219. JSTOR, www.jstor.org/stable/2704819. Accessed 16 Feb. 2020.
 Rosenne, Shabtai. “Israel and the United Nations: Changed Perspectives, 1945–1976.” The American Jewish Year Book, vol. 78, 1978, pp. 3–59. JSTOR, www.jstor.org/stable/23604292. Accessed 16 Feb. 2020.
 Letter dated 8 November 1954 to the Secretary-General of the United Nations: Arab States regret USA & UK decision to present credence in Jerusalem (corpus separatum)

Bibliography
 Hahn, Peter L. “Alignment by Coincidence: Israel, the United States, and the Partition of Jerusalem, 1949–1953.” The International History Review, vol. 21, no. 3, 1999, pp. 665–689. JSTOR, www.jstor.org/stable/40109080. Accessed 16 Feb. 2020.
 Abraham Bell and Eugene Kontorovich, PALESTINE, UTI POSSIDETIS JURIS, AND THE BORDERS OF ISRAEL

References 

1949 in law
1949 in the United Nations
December 1949 events
Israeli–Palestinian conflict and the United Nations
United Nations General Assembly resolutions concerning Israel
303(IV)